is Japanese badminton player from Aomori. He started playing badminton at the age of 5 with the influence of his father. Naraoka represented his country competed at the 2018 Summer Youth Olympics in Buenos Aires, Argentina, won the bronze medals in the boys' singles and mixed team event.

Achievements

Youth Olympic Games 
Boys' singles

World Junior Championships 
Boys' singles

BWF World Tour (1 title, 4 runners-up) 
The BWF World Tour, which was announced on 19 March 2017 and implemented in 2018, is a series of elite badminton tournaments sanctioned by the Badminton World Federation (BWF). The BWF World Tour is divided into levels of World Tour Finals, Super 1000, Super 750, Super 500, Super 300, and the BWF Tour Super 100.

Men's singles

BWF International Challenge/Series (5 titles, 2 runners-up) 
Men's singles

 BWF International Challenge tournament
 BWF International Series tournament

BWF Junior International (1 runner-up) 
Boys' singles

  BWF Junior International Grand Prix tournament
  BWF Junior International Challenge tournament
  BWF Junior International Series tournament
  BWF Junior Future Series tournament

Record against selected opponents 
Record against Year-end Finals finalists, World Championships semi finalists, and Olympic quarter finalists. Accurate as of 4 November 2022.

References

External links

 

2001 births
Living people
People from Aomori (city)
Sportspeople from Aomori Prefecture
Japanese male badminton players
Badminton players at the 2018 Summer Youth Olympics
21st-century Japanese people